ISO 31 (Quantities and units, International Organization for Standardization, 1992) is a superseded international standard concerning physical quantities, units of measurement, their interrelationships and their presentation. It was revised and replaced by ISO/IEC 80000.

Parts

The standard comes in 14 parts:

ISO 31-0:  General principles (replaced by ISO/IEC 80000-1:2009)
ISO 31-1:  Space and time (replaced by ISO/IEC 80000-3:2007)
ISO 31-2:  Periodic and related phenomena (replaced by ISO/IEC 80000-3:2007)
ISO 31-3:  Mechanics (replaced by ISO/IEC 80000-4:2006)
ISO 31-4:  Heat (replaced by ISO/IEC 80000-5)
ISO 31-5:  Electricity and magnetism (replaced by ISO/IEC 80000-6)
ISO 31-6:  Light and related electromagnetic radiations (replaced by ISO/IEC 80000-7)
ISO 31-7:  Acoustics (replaced by ISO/IEC 80000-8:2007)
ISO 31-8:  Physical chemistry and molecular physics (replaced by ISO/IEC 80000-9)
ISO 31-9:  Atomic and nuclear physics (replaced by ISO/IEC 80000-10)
ISO 31-10: Nuclear reactions and ionizing radiations (replaced by ISO/IEC 80000-10)
ISO 31-11: Mathematical signs and symbols for use in the physical sciences and technology (replaced by ISO 80000-2:2009)
ISO 31-12: Characteristic numbers (replaced by ISO/IEC 80000-11)
ISO 31-13: Solid state physics (replaced by ISO/IEC 80000-12)

A second international standard on quantities and units was IEC 60027 . The ISO 31 and IEC 60027 Standards were revised by the two standardization organizations in collaboration to integrate both standards into a joint standard ISO/IEC 80000 - Quantities and Units in which the quantities and equations used with SI are to be referred as the International System of Quantities (ISQ). ISO/IEC 80000 supersedes both ISO 31 and part of IEC 60027.

Coined words
ISO 31-0 introduced several new words into the English language that are direct spelling-calques from the French. Some of these words have been used in scientific literature.

Related national standards

Canada: CAN/CSA-Z234-1-89 Canadian Metric Practice Guide (covers some aspects of ISO 31-0, but is not a comprehensive list of physical quantities comparable to ISO 31)
United States: There are several national SI guidance documents, such as NIST SP 811, NIST SP 330, NIST SP 814, IEEE/ASTM SI 10, SAE J916. These cover many aspects of the ISO 31-0 standard, but lack the comprehensive list of quantities and units defined in the remaining parts of ISO 31.

See also
SI – the international system of units
BIPM – publishes freely available information on SI units , which overlaps with some of the material covered in ISO 31-0
IUPAP – much of the material in ISO 31 comes originally from Document IUPAP-25 of the Commission for Symbols, Units and Nomenclature (SUN Commission)  of the International Union of Pure and Applied Physics
IUPAC – some of the material in ISO 31 originates from the Interdivisional Committee on Terminology, Nomenclature and Symbols  of the International Union of Pure and Applied Chemistry
Quantities, Units and Symbols in Physical Chemistry – this IUPAC "Green Book" covers many ISO 31 definitions
 IEC 60027 Letter symbols to be used in electrical technology
 ISO 1000 SI Units and Recommendations for the use of their multiples and of certain other units (bundled with ISO 31 as the ISO Standards Handbook – Quantities and units)

Notes

References 
  (contains both ISO 31 and ISO 1000)

External links
ISO TC12 standards – Quantities, units, symbols, conversion factors

 
00031
00031
+
Measurement